Queens is an American musical drama television series that premiered on October 19, 2021, on ABC. It stars Eve, Naturi Naughton, Nadine Velazquez and Brandy Norwood. In May 2022, the series was canceled after one season.

Plot
Brianna, Naomi, Jill and Valeria once appeared as the "Nasty Bitches" in the 1990s. Together, the four of them not only turned the world of hip-hop upside down but also achieved legendary status through their music. The four women are now in their forties, unworldly and largely estranged from one another. By reuniting the four, there is now a chance to return to old fame and prestige. But will the former megastars, also known as Professor Sex, Butter Pecan, Jill Da Thrill, and Xplicit Lyrics, manage to achieve this ambitious goal?

Cast and characters

Main
 Eve J. Cooper as Brianna "Professor Sex" Robinson
Brandy Norwood as Naomi "Xplicit Lyrics" Harris-Jones
 Naturi Naughton as Jill "Da Thrill" Sumpter
 Nadine Velazquez as Valeria "Butter Pecan" Mendez
 Taylor Sele as Eric Jones, manager of the group
 Pepi Sonuga as Lauren "Lil Muffin" Rice

Recurring
 Precious Way as Jojo Harris, Naomi's 20-year-old daughter
 Cam'ron as himself, a rapper who was featured on one of the group's hit records and also had a previous relationship with Naomi. He re-enters Naomi's life as the ladies attempt to take over the hip-hop world again.
 Felisha Terrell as Tina Dubois, Jill's girlfriend
 RonReaco Lee as Jeff Robinson, Brianna's husband and the father of their five children. He is a doting dad, but unfaithful, with his behavior pushing Brianna towards divorce until a medical emergency compels the couple to come together despite the issues that have strained their marriage.
 Emerson Brooks as Darren Filgo, Jill's ex-husband and a deacon in their church
 Elaine del Valle as Valentina, a woman posing as Valeria's estranged mother
 Remy Ma as Zadie "Lady Z", Naomi's formal rival who is newly signed by Nasty Girl Records

 Fivio Foreign as himself, a rapper who has a one night stand with Brianna.

Guest
Lucius Baston as DJ Kool Red, a DJ from the early 90's that introduces the young group for the first time

Episodes

Production

Development
In January 2021, ABC ordered a pilot for a musical drama titled Queens from Scandal writer and executive producer, Zahir McGhee. In March 2021, it was announced that Tim Story would direct the pilot episode. On May 14, 2021, Queens was given a series order, with an official premiere date of October 19, 2021. On May 6, 2022, ABC canceled the series after one season.

Casting 
In February 2021, Eve was cast to play the role of Brianna. Later that month, Naturi Naughton landed the role of Jill. In March, it was announced that Pepi Sonuga would portray Lauren Rice. On March 8, 2021, Brandy was cast in the role as Naomi. The following day, Nadine Velazquez was cast as Valeria, and the day after that, Taylor Sele was cast as Eric Jones.

Music
On October 1, 2021, the first promo single from Queens (“Nasty Girl")
was released featuring Norwood alongside the cast: Eve, Naughton and Velazquez. A music video, directed by Tim Story, was released on the same day. This was followed on October 18, 2021, by another rap song from the Queens soundtrack (“The Introduction”) which was co-written by Nas. A solo song from the soundtrack (“Hear Me”), performed solely by Norwood, was also released worldwide on digital download and streaming sites on the same day. The music producer for the series is Swizz Beatz. To coincide with the second episode of the series, three new tracks were released to all digital download and streaming sites. These were “Belly of the Bitch”, “Heart of Queens” (featuring rapper Cam’ron) and a cover of Miley Cyrus' “Wrecking Ball” performed by Brandy. “Girls Gonna Run That”, rapped by the four leads, was released on November 1, 2021. Another Brandy solo was released on November 8, 2021, a cover of Bill Withers’ “Ain't No Sunshine”. Brandy's "Until My Final Breath" was released on December 13, 2021. On January 3, 2022, "Lady Z Strikes Back (Can't Stop You)" by Brandy and Remy Ma was released.

Release
In the United States, the series premiered on October 19, 2021, on ABC. In Canada, the series aired on CTV. The series is also set to premiere on Disney+ via the streaming hub Star as an original series in selected countries. In Latin America, the series will premiere as a Star+ original. In India, Disney+ Hotstar will premiere the show exclusively.

Reception

Critical response
The review aggregator website Rotten Tomatoes reported a 100% approval rating with an average rating of 8/10, based on 13 critic reviews. Metacritic, which uses a weighted average, assigned a score of 75 out of 100 based on 7 critics, indicating "generally favorable reviews".

Queens debuted on October 19, 2021, and reviews were largely positive; Caroline Framke for Variety praised the quartet’s musical offering, calling their raps “sharp and distinct […] making clear their talent as both individuals and a swaggering collective”. Liz Shannon Miller for Collider enthused the show “may become addictive viewing for longtime fans of the stars, as well as newcomers to the scene.” Joel Keller for Decider felt “There’s nothing revolutionary or daring about Queens, […] but, judging by the first episode, it’s well-executed froth that can go in any direction McGhee and his writers feel like going in.”

Ratings

References

External links 
 
 

2020s American drama television series
2020s American LGBT-related drama television series
2021 American television series debuts
2022 American television series endings
American Broadcasting Company original programming
American musical television series
English-language television shows
Hip hop television
Television series about fictional musicians
Television series by ABC Studios
Television series set in the 1990s
Television series set in the 2020s
Television shows set in Los Angeles